Toni Scanlan (born 2 April 1956) is an Australian actress best known for her role in the Australian television police drama Water Rats as Helen Blakemore. She is one of the only three actors to appear in the series from when it started to when it ended.

She was the winner of the Best Actress in a Lead Role at the 2007 Sydney Theatre Awards for her role in King Tide, despite her late call to the role, replacing the lead originally cast.

Scanlan received Best Actress in a Leading Role at the 2013 Sydney Theatre Awards for All My Sons by Arthur Miller at the opening of The Eternity Playhouse, Sydney.

References

External links

Australian television actresses
Living people
1956 births